Kelley Packer was a Republican Idaho State Representative from 2012 to 2018 representing District 28 in the B seat and was a Republican candidate for lieutenant governor in the 2018 primary election. In 2019, Packer was named head of the Bureau of Occupational Licenses (IBOL) by Governor Brad Little, a position she held until April 2020.

Education 
Packer graduated from Marsh Valley High School and earned her Associate of Arts (AA) degree from American InterContinental University. She works in Public Relations.

Elections

Packer supported Mitt Romney in the Republican Party presidential primaries, 2012.

2018 Lieutenant Governor's Race 
On April 5, 2017, Packer filed to run for Lieutenant Governor of Idaho in the Idaho Republican Party primary. On April 10, 2017, she announced her run at a campaign kickoff outside Holt Arena. She planned to make over 200 campaign stops in the campaign.

Packer drew 13.7% of the vote in the 2018 primary election, placing her fifth among Republicans seeking the office.

References

External links
Kelley Packer at the Idaho Legislature
Campaign site

Place of birth missing (living people)
Year of birth missing (living people)
Living people
Republican Party members of the Idaho House of Representatives
People from Bannock County, Idaho
Women state legislators in Idaho
21st-century American politicians
21st-century American women politicians
State cabinet secretaries of Idaho